Cara Ruth Silverman (September 24, 1959 - September 22, 2014) was an American film editor.

Born in New York City, Silverman received a degree in political science from American University, then took an internship at WNET in New York. She began her career as an assistant editor on projects such as The Bonfire of the Vanities, Cape Fear and A Bronx Tale, then secured her first solo project with Party Girl.

Silverman frequently collaborated with several directors: John Whitesell (See Spot Run, Malibu's Most Wanted), Mark Rosman (A Cinderella Story, The Perfect Man), Ken Kwapis (He's Just Not That into You, Big Miracle) and James Gunn (Super, Movie 43).

Silverman was busy working on several projects shortly before her death on September 22, 2014, two days before her 55th birthday.

References

External links 

1959 births
2014 deaths
Artists from New York City
American University alumni
American film editors